Adrama is a genus of tephritid  or fruit flies in the family Tephritidae. Some species like Adrama austeni are found in tea plantations, where they can cause some damage.

References

Trypetinae
Tephritidae genera
Taxa named by Francis Walker (entomologist)